The below is a list of the Roman Catholic churches in the state of Vermont, along with the towns or cities in which they are located.

See also
List of Catholic churches in the United States

Roman Catholic churches in Vermont
Roman Catholic Diocese of Burlington